This article is about the particular significance of the year 1906 to Wales and its people.

Incumbents

Archdruid of the National Eisteddfod of Wales – Dyfed

Lord Lieutenant of Anglesey – Sir Richard Henry Williams-Bulkeley, 12th Baronet  
Lord Lieutenant of Brecknockshire – Joseph Bailey, 2nd Baron Glanusk
Lord Lieutenant of Caernarvonshire – John Ernest Greaves
Lord Lieutenant of Cardiganshire – Herbert Davies-Evans
Lord Lieutenant of Carmarthenshire – Sir James Williams-Drummond, 4th Baronet
Lord Lieutenant of Denbighshire – William Cornwallis-West    
Lord Lieutenant of Flintshire – Hugh Robert Hughes 
Lord Lieutenant of Glamorgan – Robert Windsor-Clive, 1st Earl of Plymouth
Lord Lieutenant of Merionethshire – W. R. M. Wynne 
Lord Lieutenant of Monmouthshire – Godfrey Morgan, 1st Viscount Tredegar
Lord Lieutenant of Montgomeryshire – Sir Herbert Williams-Wynn, 7th Baronet 
Lord Lieutenant of Pembrokeshire – Frederick Campbell, 3rd Earl Cawdor
Lord Lieutenant of Radnorshire – Powlett Milbank

Bishop of Bangor – Watkin Williams 
Bishop of Llandaff – Joshua Pritchard Hughes
Bishop of St Asaph – A. G. Edwards (later Archbishop of Wales) 
Bishop of St Davids – John Owen

Events
13 February - In the United Kingdom general election:
For the first time ever, no Conservative MP is elected in Wales.
William Brace becomes Labour MP for South Glamorganshire. 
David Davies becomes Liberal MP for Montgomeryshire.
Ivor Guest becomes Liberal MP for Cardiff District.
Alfred Mond becomes Liberal MP for Chester.
John David Rees becomes Liberal MP for Montgomery District.
Ivor Treowen becomes MP for South Monmouthshire.
John Williams becomes MP for Gower District.
5 June - At the Eifion by-election, brought about by the resignation of John Bryn Roberts, Liberal candidate Ellis Davies is elected unopposed. 
27 June - One of the strongest earthquakes recorded in the UK strikes Swansea with a strength of 5.2 on the Richter Scale, damaging several buildings.
August - Evan Roberts suffers a breakdown, signalling the end of the 1904-1905 Welsh Revival.
14 August - The East Denbighshire by-election, brought about by the resignation of Samuel Moss, is won by the Liberal candidate Edward Hemmerde.
30 August - Official opening of Fishguard Harbour.
12 September - Opening of Newport Transporter Bridge.
October
The new City Hall, Cardiff, and Law Courts are opened in Cathays Park.
Opening of the first purpose-built sanatorium in Wales, at Allt-yr-yn, Newport.
A by-election is held in Mid Glamorganshire as a result of the appointment of its MP, Samuel Evans, as Recorder of Swansea; he is required to seek re-election and in the by-election he is returned unopposed.
date unknown
David Brynmor Jones is knighted.
Hydro-electricity is generated for the first time in Wales, at Cwm Dyli in Gwynedd.
Anglican Benedictine monks arrive at Caldey Island to found a community.
The South Wales Miners' Federation affiliates to the Labour Party.

Arts and literature
Ernest Rhys becomes editor of Everyman's Library.

Awards
National Eisteddfod of Wales - held in Caernarfon
Chair - John James Williams (J. J.), "Y Lloer"
Crown - Hugh Emyr Davies

New books

English language
Arthur Machen – The House of Souls
W. J. Parry – The Cry of the People
Allen Raine – Queen of the Rushes
Edward Thomas - The Heart of England

Welsh language
Owen Morgan Edwards - Clych Adgof 
Sarah Winifred Parry – Sioned: darluniau o fywyd gwledig yng Nghymru (book publication)
Eliseus Williams (Eifion Wyn) - Telynegion Maes a Mor

Music
The Welsh Folk Song Society is co-founded by soprano Mary Davies.
David Vaughan Thomas - The Knight's Burial

Theatre
10 December - The New Theatre, Cardiff, opens to the public, with a performance of Shakespeare's Twelfth Night.

Sport
Boxing 
23 May - Tom Thomas wins the British middleweight title.
Rugby union
Wales finish second in the 1906 Home Nations Championship, beating England and Scotland, but losing to Ireland.
1 December - Wales lose 11–0 to South Africa in the first encounter between the two countries.
Tennis - For the first and only time, a Davis Cup final is played in Wales.  The United States defeat Australia at Newport.

Births
10 January - Tom Arthur, Wales international rugby player
16 January - Watcyn Thomas, rugby player (died 1977)
19 February - Grace Williams, composer (died 1977)
4 March - Tommy Jones-Davies, Wales international rugby player (died 1960)
15 March - Bill Everson,  Wales international rugby player (died 1966)
4 April - John Roberts Wales international rugby player (died 1965)
24 April - Leslie Thomas, politician (died 1971)
25 June - Roger Livesey, actor (died 1976)
27 June - Vernon Watkins, poet (died 1967)
12 July - Archie Skym, international rugby union player
15 July - Herbert Edmund-Davies, Baron Edmund-Davies, judge (died 1992)
16 October - Maudie Edwards, actress (died 1991)
18 November - Nigel Birch, Baron Rhyl, politician (died 1981)
8 December - Richard Llewellyn, novelist (died 1983)

Deaths
6 January 
 Joseph Bailey, 1st Baron Glanusk, retired Lord Lieutenant of Brecknockshire, 65
 Emrys ap Iwan, writer, 54 
25 March - Gwilym Williams, judge, 66
4 June - John William Evans, politician, 36
24 June - Henry Dennis, industrialist, 80
24 July - John Edwards (Meiriadog), poet, 93
27 August - James Charles, painter, 55
4 September - William Bowen Rowlands, politician
16 September - Robert Llugwy Owen, minister and writer, 69
22 September - Griffith Arthur Jones, Anglican priest, 78
21 October - Griffith Jones (Glan Menai), writer, 70
25 November - William W. Davies, Mormon leader, 73
29 November - Mary Dillwyn Welby, photographer, 90
30 November - Sir Edward James Reed, politician, 76
30 December - William Stadden, Wales international rugby player, 45 (suicide)

References